Lieutenant-Commander Alan Brookman Beddoe, OC, OBE, HFHS, FHSC (June 1, 1893 – December 2, 1975) was a Canadian artist, war artist, consultant in heraldry and founder and first president of the Heraldry Society of Canada in 1965.

Born in Ottawa, Ontario, in 1893, he studied at Ashbury College. During World War I, he was captured at Second Battle of Ypres in 1915 and spent two and a half years in the prisoner of war camps at Gießen and Zerbst. He studied art at the Ecole des Beaux-Arts in Paris. After the war, he studied at the Art Students League of New York under DuMond and Bridgman. In 1925, he opened the first commercial art studio in Ottawa.  He was also an expert in heraldry. The Alan Beddoe collection at Library and Archives Canada contains designs and studies for the Book of Remembrance, postage stamps, posters, crests, money, architecture, coats-of-arms, and a new Canadian flag. His fonds include slides, colour transparencies, prints, watercolours and drawings related to Canadian heraldry.

Books of Remembrance

Beddoe was instrumental in the creation of the major Books of Remembrance, now housed in the Peace Tower on Parliament Hill in Ottawa.  The artist originally chosen for the job, James Purves, died in 1940, at which time Beddoe took on the task.  He supervised a team of artists for about the next 2 years to illuminate and hand-letter the books, listing the names of Canadians who died in Canada's military service during World War I and after World War II he supervised another team of artists to create the Book of Remembrance for World War II. He was inducted to the OBE and received the Allied Arts Medal awarded by the Royal Architectural Institute for his work on the Books of Remembrance and made an officer of the Order of Canada. He also was instrumental in the creation of the South Africa Book of Remembrance 1956–1966; Yvonne Diceman, who had worked with him on the Book of Remembrance WWII, produced the Korea Book of Remembrance 1957–1958 and the Newfoundland Book of Remembrance 1972.

Ships badges
The Royal Canadian Navy formed a Ships Badge Committee in 1942, and commissioned Beddoe to design official badges for the navy's ships. He designed badges for over 180 ships and establishments of the Royal Canadian Navy. In 1957, the Royal Canadian Navy appointed him its heraldic advisor.

Images

Coats of arms

Provinces and territories

He painted watercolours of the coats of arms for Canada, provinces and territories. His fonds include preliminary sketches for the coat of arms of Newfoundland and Labrador, Quebec, New Brunswick, and Yukon. In 1956, he designed coats of arms for the Yukon and Northwest Territories. 

In 1957, he was asked to revise the Coat of Arms of Canada, and his version was in use until further changes were made in 1994.

Municipalities
He painted watercolours of municipal coats of arms for many Canadian municipalities. His fonds include the designs for the Township of Esquimalt (Vancouver Island), the City of Victoria, British Columbia, the City of Hamilton, Ontario and the Township of Gloucester, Ontario.

Universities
He designed coats of arms for a number of university coats of arms including Memorial University of Newfoundland, the University of Moncton and the University of Manitoba. Photographs of his watercolours entitled "Arms of the University of Windsor" and "The Bearings Massey College in the University of Toronto" (coat of arms) are in the Alan Beddoe collection at Library and Archives Canada.

Individuals
He designed the coats of arms for a number of individuals including Georges Vanier, Viscount Monk and Charles Vincent Massey. His fonds include a colour slide of the Earl of Dufferin's coat of arms and the armorial bearings of Georges Vanier, Governor General of Canada 1959–1967. He also designed the arboreal bearings for Richard Bedford BennettThe Viscount Bennett.

Institutions
He designed the arms for a number of institutions including the Royal Canadian Geographical Society, Cambrian College and the Royal Society of Canada and his fonds includes black and white photographs of the letters patent.

Flag of Canada
During the Great Flag Debate of 1964, Beddoe was the primary advisor and artist to the Prime Minister Lester Pearson, the Cabinet and the Parliamentary Flag Committee, working on potential designs for the new flag. He designed the Pearson Pennant design with three red maple leaves on a white background with blue bars on either side representing "From sea to sea", and produced numerous other designs for consideration, including a single red maple leaf.

Art
Alan Beddoe was an artist. A drawing by Alan Beddoe entitled 'The Condemned Bridge' is in the Alan Beddoe collection at Library and Archives Canada. He created individual photographic portraits of Major Forbes Thrasher and John Wilfred Kennedy. He created group portraits of the Ottawa Choral Society, 1898, the Canadian Expeditionary Force, the Provincial Model School, Ottawa, Ontario, 1904–1905, and the 7th Officers' Disciplinary Training Class, Halifax, Nova Scotia, 1942.

Book plates
He designed several hundred book plate designs. His book plate designs for Charles Clement Tudway, Henry J. Turner, Edward Milner, and George Stacey Gibson are in the Alan Beddoe collection at Library and Archives Canada.

Legacy
In 1968, he was made an Officer of the Order of Canada. In 1943, he was made an Officer of the Order of the British Empire for services as a war artist. Alan Beddoe died in 1975.
His legacy is also continued by his son, Charles Beddoe, who followed his footsteps in many ways.

Publications
One of his most important contributions to the heraldry of Canada was Lt. Cdr. Alan Beddoe's book, Beddoe's Canadian Heraldry Rev. by Col. Strome Galloway, Belleville, Ontario: Mika Publishing Company, 1981.

"Address on Heraldry" - by A. Beddoe n.d.
"A Brief on the Subject of Heraldry in Canada" by A. Beddoe n.d.
"A Commentary on Heraldry in Canada" - by A. Beddoe n.d.
"Flags used in Canada" - by A.Beddoe n.d.
"Heraldry in Canada" by A. Beddoe n.d.
"Heraldry and Its Relation to Genealogy" by A. Beddoe n.d.
"Some Notes about Heraldry in Canada" - by A. Beddoe n.d.
"The Coat-of-Arms" - by A. Beddoe n.d.
"The Heraldry of Canada" - by A. Beddoe n.d.
"The Legal and Constitutional Position of Heraldry in Canada" by A. Beddoe

See also
 Canadian official war artists
 War artist
 Military art

Notes

External links
  
 
 "The maple leaf has symbolized Canada for 50 years, but its origins are still misunderstood," National Post, 15 December 2014

1893 births
1975 deaths
Canadian war artists
Heraldic artists
Officers of the Order of Canada
Artists from Ottawa
Canadian Officers of the Order of the British Empire
Art Students League of New York alumni
Canadian designers
Canadian alumni of the École des Beaux-Arts
Flag designers
Fellows of the Royal Heraldry Society of Canada